Reidar Krummradt Lie (born 1954) is a Norwegian philosopher and professor of philosophy at the University of Bergen. He is also adjunct professor at the Institute of Basic Medical Sciences in Beijing, China, and adjunct researcher at the Department of Bioethics at the National Institutes of Health in Bethesda Maryland, US. He was previously adjunct professor at the Thammasat University in Bangkok, Thailand, and director of the Center for Medical Ethics at the University of Oslo in Norway. Lie is known for his research on bioethics and research ethics.

Edited books
 Oxford Textbook of Clinical Research Ethics, Oxford University Press, 2008
 Evidence-based Practice in Medicine and Health Care: A Discussion of the Ethical Issues, Springer, Berlin Verlag, 2005
 Healthy thoughts: European Perspectives on Health Care Ethics. Peeters Verlag, Leuven, 2002
 Health Ethics in Six SEAR Countries. WHO-SEARO, New Delhi, 1999
 Kompendium i medisinsk etikk og vitenskapsteori.  Universitetsforlaget, Oslo 1982

References

External links
 Official Website
 Reider Lie at the University of Bergen
 Reidar Lie, Google Scholar

Norwegian philosophers
Analytic philosophers
Philosophy academics
Living people
20th-century Norwegian physicians
Bioethicists
University of Minnesota alumni
Academic staff of the University of Bergen
University of Bergen alumni
Academic staff of the University of Oslo
1954 births